The 1986 Boston University Terriers football team was an American football team that represented Boston University as a member of the Yankee Conference during the 1986 NCAA Division I-AA football season. In their second season under head coach Steve Stetson, the Terriers compiled a 4–7 record (3–4 against conference opponents), finished in a three-way tie for fifth place in the Yankee Conference, and were outscored by a total of 304 to 205.

Schedule

References

Boston University
Boston University Terriers football seasons
Boston University Terriers football